Operation Delilah is a 1967 Spanish comedy film starring Rory Calhoun.

External links

1967 films
Spanish comedy films
1960s Spanish-language films
Films produced by Sidney W. Pink
1960s English-language films
1960s Spanish films